John Anthony Barrasso III (born July 21, 1952) is an American physician and politician serving as the senior United States senator from Wyoming, a seat he has held since 2007. A member of the Republican Party, he served in the Wyoming State Senate from 2003 to 2007.

Born and raised in Reading, Pennsylvania, Barrasso graduated from Georgetown University, where he received his B.S. and M.D. He conducted his medical residency at Yale University before moving to Wyoming and beginning a private orthopedics practice in Casper. Barrasso was active in various medical societies and associations.

Barrasso first ran for U.S. Senate in 1996, narrowly losing the Republican primary to Mike Enzi. In 2002, he was elected to the state Senate, where he stayed until his appointment to the U.S. Senate after the 2007 death of incumbent Craig L. Thomas. He was elected to finish Thomas's term in 2008 and reelected in 2012 and 2018. In 2018, Barrasso was selected as chair of the Senate Republican Conference. He is the dean of Wyoming's congressional delegation.

Early life, education, and medical career
Barrasso was born in Reading, Pennsylvania, in 1952, the son of Louise M. (née DeCisco) and John Anthony Barrasso, Jr. He is of Italian descent. He is a 1970 graduate of the former Central Catholic High School, which in 2011 merged with Holy Name High School to form Berks Catholic High School. Barrasso attended Rensselaer Polytechnic Institute (where he became a member of Phi Kappa Tau fraternity) for two years before transferring to Georgetown University in Washington, D.C., graduating Phi Beta Kappa in 1974 with a Bachelor of Science degree in biology. He received his M.D. degree from Georgetown University School of Medicine in 1978. He conducted his residency at Yale Medical School in New Haven, Connecticut.

In 1983, after completing of his residency at Yale, Barrasso moved to Wyoming, with his wife at the time, Linda Nix. He joined a private orthopedic practice in Casper and for a time was the Wyoming Medical Center's chief of staff. He was State President of the Wyoming Medical Society, President of the National Association of Physician Broadcasters, and a member of the American Medical Association Council of Ethics and Judicial Affairs.

Barrasso was also a rodeo physician for the Professional Rodeo Cowboy's Association (and a member of the "Cowboy Joe Club") and volunteered as a team physician for Casper College as well as several local high schools. Barrasso was a board-certified orthopedic surgeon in private practice in Casper from 1983 to 2007.

1996 U.S. Senate election

Barrasso ran for the Republican nomination for the U.S. Senate in 1996 for the seat being vacated by Republican Alan K. Simpson, losing narrowly to State Senator Mike Enzi, 32% to 30%, in a nine-candidate election.

Wyoming Senate
Barrasso was elected to the Wyoming Senate unopposed in 2002 and reelected unopposed in 2006. During his time in the State Senate he chaired the Transportation and Highways Committee.

U.S. Senate

Appointment
On June 22, 2007, Governor Dave Freudenthal appointed Barrasso to replace Senator Craig L. Thomas, who died earlier that month. Under state law, Freudenthal was able to consider only three individuals chosen by the Republican State Central Committee because the seat was vacated by a Republican. The others were former State Treasurer Cynthia Lummis of Cheyenne, later Wyoming's member of the United States House of Representatives and its junior U.S. senator, and former Republican State Chairman and lobbyist Tom Sansonetti, a former aide to Thomas. Matt Mead, grandson of former Senator Clifford P. Hansen, also sought the nomination, as did the 2006 gubernatorial nominee Ray Hunkins, a Wheatland rancher and lawyer. Mead was elected governor of Wyoming in 2010, and Lummis was elected to Congress in 2008, and to the Senate in 2020, where she now serves alongside Barrasso. When he was appointed, Barrasso said he would also run in the November 2008 special election to fill the remainder of Thomas's term.

Elections
2008

Barrasso announced on May 19, 2008, that he would run in the general election in 2008 to serve the remainder of Thomas's term, though he had already stated that intention before his appointment. Tom Sansonetti, one of the three Republican candidates selected for consideration by Freudenthal, said he would not challenge Barrasso in the primary. The other candidate for selection, Cynthia Lummis, was a candidate for the Republican nomination to replace retiring U.S. Representative Barbara Cubin for the state's at-large seat in the U.S. House of Representatives. Barrasso did not face a primary opponent. The Democratic nominee was Nick Carter, a lawyer from Gillette. Pundits unanimously rated the race "Safe Republican." As expected, Barrasso won the general election in a landslide, garnering 73% of the vote.

2012

Barrasso ran for reelection to a first full term in 2012. He faced three opponents for the Republican nomination, which he won with 90% of the vote. In the general election, he faced Democratic nominee Tim Chestnut, a member of the Albany County Board of Commissioners. Barrasso won the election with 76% of the vote.

2018

Barrasso was reelected with 67% of the vote over Teton County School Board Trustee Gary Trauner, the lowest percentage of his three U.S. Senate campaigns and the closest a Democrat came to winning the seat since the 1996 election.

Tenure

At the time of his appointment to the U.S. Senate in 2007, Barrasso was quoted as saying on his application: "I believe in limited government, lower taxes, less spending, traditional family values, local control and a strong national defense"; he also said that he had "voted for prayer in schools, against gay marriage and [had] sponsored legislation to protect the sanctity of life".

During the COVID-19 pandemic in the United States, Barasso voted against the American Rescue Plan Act of 2021 but for the PPP Extension Act and the COVID-19 Hate Crimes Act.

Committee assignments 
Committee on Energy and Natural Resources (Ranking Member)
As Ranking Member of the full committee, Barrasso may serve as an ex officio member of all subcommittees.
Committee on Finance
Subcommittee on Energy, Natural Resources, and Infrastructure
Subcommittee on Health Care
Subcommittee on International Trade, Customs, and Global Competitiveness
Committee on Foreign Relations
Subcommittee on Africa and Global Health Policy
Subcommittee on Europe and Regional Security Cooperation
Subcommittee on Multilateral International Development, Multilateral Institutions, and International Economic, Energy and Environmental Policy
Subcommittee on State Department and USAID Management, International Operations, and Bilateral International Development (Ranking Member)
Subcommittee on Western Hemisphere, Transnational Crime, Civilian Security, Democracy, Human Rights, and Global Women's Issues

Political positions

Abortion
When Barrasso ran for the 1996 Republican nomination for U.S. Senate, he presented himself as a supporter of abortion rights. During his tenure in the Wyoming Legislature, he sponsored an unsuccessful bill to treat the killing of a pregnant woman as a double homicide. He has voted to prohibit federal funding for abortion.

Gun laws
In 2002, he received an "A" rating from the National Rifle Association. According to a Washington Post survey, he has voted with Republicans 94% of the time.

In April 2013, Barrasso was one of 46 senators to vote against a bill that would have expanded background checks for all gun buyers. He voted with 40 Republicans and 5 Democrats to stop the bill.

Health care
Barrasso voted against the Affordable Care Act (Obamacare) in December 2009, and against the Health Care and Education Reconciliation Act of 2010. He was part of the group of 13 senators drafting the Senate version of the American Health Care Act of 2017, an Obamacare repeal bill that failed to pass.

Environment
When asked in 2014 whether human activity contributes to climate change, Barrasso said, denying the existence of the scientific consensus on climate change, "The role human activity plays is not known." In 2021, he admitted, "We believe that mankind is certainly contributing to that". The consensus is that mankind is not just contributing, but that all of climate change is anthropogenic (caused by humans).

As of October 2020, Barrasso has a 7% lifetime score on the National Environmental Scorecard of the League of Conservation Voters. He was a leading opponent of President Barack Obama's climate change policies.

Barrasso opposed the CIA's creation of its Center on Climate Change and National Security in 2009.  In 2011, he introduced a bill that would prevent the Environmental Protection Agency from limiting carbon dioxide emissions.

Barrasso, Enzi and Senator Pat Roberts introduced a bill to remove tax credits for electric cars.

Barrasso co-authored and was one of 22 senators to sign a letter to President Donald Trump urging Trump to withdraw the United States from the Paris Agreement. According to OpenSecrets, Barrasso has received over $585,000 from the oil and gas industry since 2012. In 2018 alone he received over $690,000 in funding from oil and gas companies.

In 2019, Barrasso inaccurately claimed that "livestock will be banned" as a result of the Green New Deal, and said we needed to "say goodbye to dairy, to beef, to family farms, to ranches. American favorites like cheeseburgers and milkshake would become a thing of the past."

In September 2020, Barrasso supported a measure to dramatically limit the use of hydrofluorocarbons, used in refrigerants and other applications that have contributed to global warming. Sixteen other Republican U.S. Senators joined him in voting for the bill. Joint efforts by U.S. manufacturers, environmentalists, and conservative organizations appear to have persuaded those lawmakers. "This agreement protects both American consumers and American businesses," Barrasso said. "We can have clean air without damaging our economy."

In November 2022, Barasso criticized China's "developing country advantage" in international climate agreements, arguing that China is given unfair privileges in climate agreements that do not reflect its economic growth.

Criminal justice
Barrasso opposed the FIRST STEP Act, legislation which sought to reform the federal prison system. The bill passed 87–12 on December 18, 2018.

Foreign policy
Barrasso opposed the Russian-backed Nord Stream 2—a pipeline to deliver natural gas from Russia to Germany. Bloomberg News reported, "Congress brought forward bills authorizing the administration to levy sanctions against a consortium of five European energy companies that have partnered with [Russia's main gas company] Gazprom; at least one bill, sponsored by Republican Senator John Barrasso, would make them mandatory." In May 2022, during the Russo-Ukrainian War, Barrasso visited Kyiv and met with Ukrainian president Volodymyr Zelenskyy as a part of a U.S. Senate delegation to show support to Ukraine. The delegation also visited Finland to meet with President Sauli Niinistö and Prime Minister Sanna Marin to express support for Finland's application to join NATO.

Donald Trump 
After it was revealed in November 2018 that Trump had business dealings with Russia while a candidate in the 2016 election, Barrasso said, "The president is an international businessman; I’m not surprised he was doing international business." Asked whether Trump should have disclosed those business ties during the campaign, Barrasso said, "There were so many things involved in the 2016 campaign, it’s hard to point to what one thing influenced voters." Barrasso joined Trump on Thanksgiving 2019 in a surprise visit to American troops stationed at Bagram Air Base in Afghanistan. At the time, approximately 370 Wyoming National Guard soldiers were deployed in Europe and the Middle East, the most since 2009.

In December 2019, Barrasso appeared to promote Senator John Kennedy's views supporting the discredited conspiracy theory of Ukrainian interference in the 2016 U.S. presidential election.

In February 2021, Barrasso opposed the second impeachment of Donald Trump, calling it a "partisan crusade." On February 13, 2021, Barrasso voted to acquit Trump of inciting the 2021 United States Capitol attack. On May 28, 2021, Barrasso voted against creating the January 6 commission. In November 2021, Barrasso refused to condemn Trump for defending January 6 rioters who called for Pence's death.

Personal life
Barrasso has three children. He is divorced from Linda Nix and married to his second wife, Bobbi Brown. On August 11, 2007, during Cheyenne's annual Race for the Cure, Barrasso and Brown, herself a breast cancer survivor and at the time the director of Barrasso's state senate offices, announced their engagement. Brown then resigned from her position in Barrasso's state Senate offices. They were married on January 1, 2008, in Thermopolis.

Barrasso is a member of the board of directors of Presidential Classroom, and a member of the Casper Chamber of Commerce. He identifies as a member of the Presbyterian Church (USA).

Election history

See also
Physicians in the United States Congress
List of United States senators from Wyoming

References

External links

Senator John Barrasso official U.S. Senate website
John Barrasso for U.S. Senate official campaign website

 
Wyoming's New Senator Rita Healy and P.G. Sittenfeld, Time Magazine, June 22, 2007
A Profile of Wyoming's New Senator Elsa Heidorn, NPR All Things Considered, June 23, 2007
Wyoming State Senate Members Site

|-

|-

|-

|-

|-

|-

|-

|-

|-

|-

|-

1952 births
20th-century American physicians
20th-century American politicians
21st-century American politicians
20th-century surgeons
American columnists
American orthopedic surgeons
American people of Italian descent
American Presbyterians
American sports physicians
Candidates in the 1996 United States elections
Georgetown University School of Medicine alumni
Living people
Politicians from Casper, Wyoming
Physicians from Wyoming
Protestants from Wyoming
Republican Party United States senators from Wyoming
Republican Party Wyoming state senators